Sant Andreu is one of the ten districts of Barcelona since its redistricting in 1984. It was named after the former municipality of Sant Andreu de Palomar, which was the largest in the area and now makes up the bulk of the neighbourhood bearing its name, as well as part of the neighboring district of Nou Barris.

Its size is 653 ha. (third district in size) and it had 142,598 inhabitants in 2005. It is in the northern part of the city, bordering the river Besòs, two adjacent towns in the metropolitan area, Sant Adrià de Besòs and Santa Coloma de Gramenet, and three other districts of Barcelona: Nou Barris, Horta-Guinardó and Sant Martí.

Neighborhoods
It is further divided in seven neighborhoods:
 Sant Andreu de Palomar
 La Sagrera
 Trinitat Vella
 Baró de Viver
 Navas
 El Congrés i els Indians
 Bon Pastor

See also
Sant Andreu Arenal railway station
Sant Andreu Comtal railway station
Bac de Roda Bridge
Casa Bloc
UE Sant Andreu (football club)

 Street names in Barcelona
 Urban planning of Barcelona

Sources

External links

Sant Andreu de Palomar council website
Unió Esportiva Sant Andreu
L'Eix comercial de Sant Andreu

 
Districts of Barcelona